Gail Ann Goestenkors (born February 26, 1963) is an American basketball coach who is currently an assistant coach for the Kentucky Wildcats women's basketball team.

She is perhaps best known as the women's college basketball head coach of Duke University and The University of Texas. She led Duke from 1992 until 2007, when she was hired to replace the retiring Jody Conradt at Texas. Goestenkors left Texas following the 2011–12 season citing fatigue.

Goestenkors accumulated an impressive record at Duke, where she received recognition as the ACC Coach of the Year a record 7 times (1996, 1998, 1999, 2002, 2003, 2004, and 2007). In the 2001–02 season, Goestenkors led the Blue Devils to the first undefeated regular season in ACC women's basketball history — a feat she would repeat two other times during her tenure at Duke (2003, 2007). During her final ten seasons at Duke, Goestenkors led the Blue Devils to NCAA Tournament Sweet Sixteen appearances every year, seven Elite Eight appearances, four Final Four appearances, and two appearances in the NCAA Championship game. During her tenure, her teams won five ACC tournament championships and eight ACC regular season titles. Goestenkors holds the ACC record for fewest games required to achieve 300 wins (387 games).

In 2014-2015, she was an assistant coach with the Indiana Fever and the Los Angeles Sparks of the Women's National Basketball Association.

Born in Waterford, Michigan, Goestenkors attended Saginaw Valley State University, where she played under future Purdue head coach Marsha Reall. After graduating in 1985, Goestenkors became a graduate assistant coach at Iowa State. After one season, she left to become an assistant coach at Purdue under Lin Dunn, where she remained until becoming head coach at Duke in 1992.

Goestenkors was inducted into the Women's Basketball Hall of Fame as one of six members of the Class of 2015.

NCAA Tournaments
Goestenkors' 1998-99 Duke team finished in second place, losing to the Carolyn Peck-coached Purdue Lady Boilermakers in the championship game. Along the way, Duke defeated the Tennessee Lady Vols in the Elite Eight, spoiling Chamique Holdsclaw's bid for a clean sweep of the National Championship (Holdsclaw had starred on Tennessee's National Championship teams as a freshman, sophomore and junior). Duke's historic upset ended the Lady Vols' three-year run of national championships with a 69–63 victory over Tennessee in the final of the 1999 East Regionaland that sent shock waves through the sport.

Goestenkors' 2004-05 squad made the NCAA Elite Eight and posted a 31–5 record despite the loss of National Player of the Year Alana Beard to graduation.

In 2003–04 with Beard leading the way, the Blue Devils advanced to the NCAA Elite Eight, boasted a 30–4 record, won a fifth-straight ACC Tournament championship and fourth-straight ACC regular season title, and broke the University of Connecticut's 69-game home winning steak with a 68-67 comeback victory in Hartford, Connecticut.

Goestenkors led the Blue Devils to an ACC-record 35-2 ledger in 2002-03 and their second straight NCAA Final Four appearance. For the second consecutive year, Duke posted a 19–0 record against ACC opponents. The 2001–02 season produced similar success. She led the Blue Devils to a 31–4 record and an NCAA Final Four appearance. Duke became the first ACC school to produce an undefeated 19–0 record in the ACC by winning the regular season and Tournament titles. The Blue Devils in 2000-01 posted a 30–4 record, won ACC Tournament and ACC regular season championships and earned a No. 1 seed in the NCAA Tournament. The 2006–2007 season ended with a 32–2 record and notched her school's first ever undefeated regular season. She is often known as the "winningest coach not to have won a championship", being runner-up two times in fifteen years. Goestenkors also won the ACC Coach of the Year award in 2007 for the seventh time in fifteen years.

USA Basketball
Goestenkors served as the head coach of the USA representative to the 1997 William Jones Cup competition The event was held in Taipei, Taiwan during August 1997.  The USA team won their first six games. Four of the six were decided by six points or fewer, including the semifinal game against Japan which went to overtime. In the gold medal game, the USA faced undefeated South Korea. The USA team played to a six-point margin early in the second half, but could not extend the margin.  South Korea came back, took the lead, and held on to win the championship and the gold medal 76–71.

Goestenkors served as an assistant coach to the National team in the 2002 World Championships, held during September in three cities in China, including Nanjing, China. The USA won the opening six preliminary rounds easily, with no contest closer than 30 points. That included the opening round game against Russia, who has played them close in the 1998 Championship final. In the opening game, the USA won 89–55 behind 20 points form Lisa Leslie and 17 from Sheryl Swoopes. The USA wasn't seriously challenged in the quarterfinals, where they beat Spain by 39 points. The semifinal game against Australia was closer, but Leslie had a double-double with 24 points and 13 rebounds to help the USA team win by 15 points. In the championship game, much like the 1998 finals, the rematch was much closer. This time the USA team did not have to play form behind, and  had a ten-point lead late ant he game, but the Russians cut the lead to a single point with just over three minutes remaining. The game remained close, and was within three points with just over twelve seconds to go, but Swoopes was fouled and sank the free throws to give the USA a 79–74 win and the gold medal.

Goestenkors served as an assistant coach for the USA National team in 2006, a team in transition. Lisa Leslie, who had led the team in scoring in the 2004 Olympics, the 2002 World Championships, the 2000 Olympics, the 1998 World Championships, and the 1996 Olympics was no longer on the team. Sheryl Swoopes was available but hampered by injuries, and Dawn Staley moved on to coaching. Newcomers Sue Bird, Candace Parker and Diana Taurasi picked up the slack, but it was a team in transition. As an additional challenge, some members of the squad were unable to join the team for practices due to WNBA commitments. The team started out strong, winning each of the six preliminary games, including the game against Russia. In the quarterfinals, the USA team beat Spain 90–56. The semifinal was a rematch against Russia, but this time the Russian team prevailed, 75–68. The USA faced Brazil in the bronze medal game, and won easily 99–59.

Awards
 Associated Press National Coach of the Year (2007)
 ACC Coach of the Year (1996, 1998, 1999, 2002, 2003, 2004, 2007)
 WBCA District Coach of the Year (1995, 2001, 2002, 2003, 2004)
 USA Basketball National Coach of the Year (2006)
 WBCA National Coach of the Year (2003, 2007)
 Victor Award Coach of the Year (1999, 2003)
 Naismith National Coach of the Year (2003)
 GBallMag.com Coach of the Year (2002)
 Basketball Times Coach of the Year (2000)
 Carol Eckman Award (2006)
 US Basketball Writers Association (USBWA) Coach of the Year award (2007)

Head coaching record

Source:

Personal life
Goestenkors's ex-husband is Mark Simons, who was an assistant coach at a number of women's college basketball programs, including Georgia Tech, Auburn and Michigan State.

References

External links
Texas Athletics — Women's Basketball
The University of Texas at Austin

1963 births
Living people
American women's basketball coaches
Basketball coaches from Michigan
Basketball players from Michigan
Central Michigan Chippewas women's basketball coaches
Duke Blue Devils women's basketball coaches
Indiana Fever coaches
Kentucky Wildcats women's basketball coaches
Los Angeles Sparks coaches
People from Waterford, Michigan
Purdue Boilermakers women's basketball coaches
Saginaw Valley State Cardinals women's basketball players
Texas Longhorns women's basketball coaches
Point guards